This is a complete list of operas by Simon Mayr (1763 – 1845); for his other compositions see List of compositions by Simon Mayr.

List

References
Notes

Sources
 Balthazar, Scott L (1992), "Mayr, Simon" in The New Grove Dictionary of Opera, ed. Stanley Sadie (London) 
 Some of the information in this article is taken from the related French Wikipedia article.

 
Lists of operas by composer
Lists of compositions by composer